is a Japanese shōjo manga artist. She debuted in 1978 with the short story  Koi wa Happy Snow ni Notte (monthly HITOMI, AKITA Publishing CO.,LTD).

Selected bibliography

Shōjo manga
 Lady!! (レディ!!)
The manga was adapted into anime television series - Lady Lady!! and Hello! Lady Lynn in 1987 by Toei Animation Co.,Ltd..
 Lady Lynn! (レディ リン!)
a sequel to Lady!!
 Lynn no Kodomotachi & Peter Pan (リンのこどもたち&ぴぃたぁぱん)
Hanabusa’s official dojinshi that focuses on two children of Lynn and Edward.
 Premier Muguet (プルミエ・ミュゲ) story by Kyoko Mizuki
 Heart ni Aozora Yohou (ハートに青空予報)
 Kirameki Green Age (きらめきグリーンエイジ)
 Milk Miracle (みるく みらくる)
 Majinai Ningyou (呪い人形)
 Time Princess (タイムプリンセス)
 Kurayami no Yubiwa (暗闇の指輪)
 Hoho Yosete Dakishimete (ほほよせて抱きしめて)
 Yaneura Beya e Youkoso (屋根裏部屋へようこそ)
 Hatsukoi Swimming (初恋スイミング)
 Engage Kiss (エンゲージ・キス)
 Jooubachi (女王蜂)
 Roma no Kyuujitu (ローマの休日) adapted from Roman Holiday Paramount Pictures

Manga adaptations of western romance novels

Idol Dreams リッツで夕食 (Charlotte Lamb, A Wild Affair) Dark Horse Comics, Inc.
鏡の中の女  (Charlotte Lamb, The Devil's Arm)
恋の砂漠  (Charlotte Lamb, Desert Barbarian)
ローレライ愛の調べ (Lucy Gordon, Song of the Lorelei)
手紙 (Lucy Gordon, Farelli's Wife)
ある日突然結婚 (Diana Hamilton, An Inconvenient Marriage)
身代わりプリンセス (Tracy Sinclair, The Princess Gets Engaged)
王子様とわたし (Elizabeth Harbison, Annie and the Prince)
いつしか求愛 (Carole Mortimer, To Woo a Wife)
あこがれる心の裏で (Carole Mortimer, To Be a Husband)
今夜だけのパートナー (Carole Mortimer, To Be a Bridegroom)
悩める伯爵 (Anne Ashley, The Earl of Rayne's Ward)
消えた子爵夫人 (Anne Ashley, Lady Linford's Return)
泥棒は恋の始まり (Anne Gracie, An Honourable Thief)
献身 (Violet Winspear, Passionate Sinner)
ハリウッドの天使 (Violet Winspear, Lucifer's Angel)
情熱のマスカレード (Emma Darcy, The Power and the Passion)
王子様は、ある日突然 (Miranda Lee, Knight to the Rescue)
プリンスと虹色の指輪 (Joan Elliott Pickart, Man...Mercenary...Monarch)
一夜だけの花嫁 (Day Leclaire, One Night Wife)
無邪気なかけひき (Penny Jordan, The Sheikh's Virgin Bride)
誘惑はオアシスで (Penny Jordan, One Night with the Sheikh)
砂塵に舞う花嫁 (Penny Jordan, Possessed by the Sheikh)
愛は復讐の果てに (Penny Jordan, The Perfect Seduction)
危険な結婚 (Helen Bianchin, A Passionate Surrender)
愛の惑い (Helen Bianchin, The Greek Bridegroom)
見知らぬ国で (Catherine George, Devil Within)
堕ちた愛人 (Susanne McCarthy, No Place for Love)
プリンセスへの階段 (Cathie Linz, A Prince At Last!)
フィアンセは当店で (Jackie Braun, One Fiancee to Go, Please)
銀色に光る海で (Miranda Jarrett, The Silver Lord)
リメンバー・ミー (Sharon Sala, Remember Me)
さらわれたハート (Barbara Cartland, The Wing of Ecstasy)
公爵の花嫁 (Barbara Cartland, A Nightingale Sang)

External links

Youko Hanabusa's Official Website: リンのマーブル館 
RomaPuri official blog 
OHZORA Publishing, Co. Romance Comic Official Website 
Harlequin Pink: Idol Dreams Preview page
Yoko Hanabusa's authorized fansite: Yoko Hanabusa Fan Club
Yoko Hanabusa's authorized fansite: Yoko Hanabusa Fan Page (in Japanese)

Living people
People from Tokyo
Manga artists from Tokyo
Year of birth missing (living people)